Adam Boqvist (born 15 August 2000) is a Swedish professional ice hockey defenceman for the Columbus Blue Jackets of the National Hockey League (NHL). He was selected eighth overall by the Chicago Blackhawks in the 2018 NHL Entry Draft.

Playing career
Boqvist made his Swedish Hockey League debut with Brynäs IF on 21 September 2017.

Following the 2018 NHL Entry Draft, where he was selected eight overall, Boqvist signed a three-year, entry-level contract with the Chicago Blackhawks. On 5 July 2018, the London Knights of the Ontario Hockey League (OHL) announced that Boqvist would join the team for the 2018–19 season. Boqvist scored his first NHL career goal in a 3–2 win over the Anaheim Ducks on 3 November 2019.

On 23 July 2021, Boqvist, along with multiple draft picks, was traded to the Columbus Blue Jackets in exchange for Seth Jones and multiple draft picks. On 6 July 2022, Boqvist signed a three-year, $7.8 million contract extension with the Blue Jackets.

Personal life
Adam's older brother Jesper Boqvist is a centre for the New Jersey Devils.

Career statistics

Regular season and playoffs

International

References

External links
 

2000 births
Living people
Almtuna IS players
Brynäs IF players
Chicago Blackhawks draft picks
Chicago Blackhawks players
Columbus Blue Jackets players
London Knights players
National Hockey League first-round draft picks
People from Falun
Rockford IceHogs (AHL) players
Sportspeople from Dalarna County
Swedish ice hockey defencemen